Marcellus Flemming Berry was an American inventor who devised the traveller's cheque while working for American Express.

References

Living people
Year of birth missing (living people)
American inventors